Anthony Francis Godfrey is an American career diplomat who served as the United States Ambassador to Serbia from 2019 until 2022.

Education
Godfrey earned a Bachelor of Arts from the University of California at Davis.

Career
At the time of his appointment as Ambassador, Godfrey had worked for the Foreign Service for almost thirty years. Before that, he served 12 years in the United States Navy.

For four years, prior to his appointment as Ambassador, he was a Political Minister Counselor and then a Deputy Chief of Mission at the U.S. Embassy in Moscow, Russia.

United States Ambassador to Serbia

On June 18, 2019, President Trump announced his intent to nominate Godfrey as the next Ambassador to Serbia. On June 24, 2019, his nomination was sent to the United States Senate. His nomination was confirmed by voice vote on September 26, 2019.

Personal

Godfrey is married to Anne Marie (O'Toole) Godfrey. They have three children. Godfrey speaks Russian, Serbian and Turkish.

See also
List of current ambassadors of the United States

References

Date of birth missing (living people)
Living people
University of California, Davis alumni
United States Foreign Service personnel
21st-century American diplomats
Ambassadors of the United States to Serbia
Year of birth missing (living people)